Castle Point is a hamlet in Dutchess County, New York, United States. Castle Point has a post office with ZIP code 12511.

References

Hamlets in Dutchess County, New York
Hamlets in New York (state)